Yumadybash (Yomaźıbaş) is a rural locality (a selo) in Chalmalinsky Selsoviet, Sharansky District, Bashkortostan, Russia. The population was 519 as of 2010. There are 4 street.

Geography 
Yumadybash is located 13 km south of Sharan (the district's administrative centre) by road. Tarkhan is the nearest rural locality.

References 

Rural localities in Sharansky District